The 2008 European Track Championships took place in Pruszków, Poland from 3 September to 7 September 2008. They were the annual European championship for track cycling for junior and under 23 riders. Events were also held at elite level in the women's omnium discipline. A men's omnium European Championship was held in Alkmaar, the Netherlands at 18 October 2008.

Countries
  Belarus at the 2008 UEC European Track Championships
  Great Britain at the 2008 UEC European Track Championships
  Lithuania at the 2008 UEC European Track Championships
  Netherlands at the 2008 UEC European Track Championships
Incomplete list

Medal summary

Open
Open events were held in the omnium discipline only.

Omnium sprint

Under 23

i) There were awarded 2 gold medals (and no silver medal) because Ellen van Dijk and Lizzie Armitstead finished at the same time. See the finishfoto.

Juniors

Medal table

See also

2008 in track cycling

References

External links
Official website
Official results at Tissottiming.com
Results book

European Track Championships, 2008
International cycle races hosted by Poland
2008 in Polish sport
Pruszków County
European Track Championships